Secretary to the Government means the Secretary (including Acting Secretary) being the administrative head of a Division or a Ministry in Bangladesh.

All these Secretaries are assisted by Additional Secretary, Joint Secretary, Deputy Secretary and Assistant Secretary.

References

Government occupations
Bangladeshi civil servants
Positions of authority